The Jats of Kutch are a cattle breeding nomadic Muslim community, found in the Kutch region of Gujarat in India. They are one of a number of communities of Maldhari pastoral nomads found in the Banni region of Kutch.

History and origin 

The Jat, or Jath claim descent from ancient pastoral tribes of the Indus River Delta region of Sindh, where some members of the tribe still reside. Jath word come from Sindhi word jotay for this peoples. Jath are converted Muslim. Jath of kutch and Sindh belong to rabari tribe. Some rabaris Camel herder's groups of Balochistan converted into Islam and known as jath. Some that were assimilated from later waves of migration and who remain in Sindh are referred to as the Sindhi Jats. From there, they moved into the Bani region in search of pastorage. With the partition of India, the Jat of Kutch have lost all contact with their kinsmen in Sindh.

Present circumstances 

The Jats are a Maldhari cattle-herding group, and are mainly distributed in Kutch and Saurashtra. They have three territorial divisions, the Halari Jat (found in Jamnagar and Porbandar), Verai Jat (Banaskantha District), and Kutchi Jat (found in Kutch District). The Kutchi are further subdivided into the Dhanetah, Girasia and Fakirani, the latter consider themselves superior to the other two, and are strictly endogamous. They are further divided into clans like the Badajang, Podani, Aamar, Vangayi, while the Girasia are divided into the Mudrag, Bhallad and Hallayi. All these clans, except the Fakirani, enjoy equal status. The Saurashtra Jat, known as Malek, maintain a system of gotra exogamy.

In addition to cattle rearing, the community are also involved in the breeding of camels, especially the Fakirani. A good many of the Saurashtra community are small-scale peasant farmers. A few are landless, and work as agricultural labourers. The Kutch Jat are also known for their embroidery work.

See also 
 Jat
 Jats of Sindh

References 

Jat
Kutchi people
Maldhari communities
Muslim communities of Gujarat
Muslim communities of India
Sindhi tribes in India
Social groups of Gujarat
South Asian people
Tribes of Kutch